Liu Yan may refer to:
 Liu Yan (Xin dynasty) (died 23 AD), rebel leader against the Xin dynasty
 Liu Yan (Han dynasty warlord) (died 194), Eastern Han nobleman and warlord
 Liu Yan (Shu Han) (died 234), general of Shu Han during the Three Kingdoms period
 Liu Yan (Tang dynasty) (715/716–780), Tang dynasty chancellor
 Liu Yan (emperor) (889–942), founding emperor of Southern Han during the Five Dynasties and Ten Kingdoms period
 Liu Yan (actress) (born 1980), Chinese actress, hostess and singer
 Liu Yan (dancer) (born 1982), Chinese dancer
 Liu Yan (figure skater) (born 1984), Chinese figure skater
 Liu Yan (scientist) (fl. 2000s–2010s), Antarctic researcher
 Yan Liu (geographer) (fl. 2000s), Australian researcher
 Liu Yan (chess player) (born 2000), a player in the World Youth Chess Championship